Anthony Mervyn Smith (born 26 February 1930) is a former English cricketer.  Smith was a left-handed batsman who bowled slow left-arm orthodox.  He was born at Castle Combe, Wiltshire.

Smith made his Minor Counties Championship debut for Wiltshire in 1955 against the Kent Second XI.  From 1955 to 1968, he represented the county in 42 Minor Counties Championship matches, the last of which came against Dorset.

Smith also represented Wiltshire in List-A cricket.  His debut List-A match came against Hampshire in the 1964 Gillette Cup.  From 1964 to 1969, he represented the county in 3 List-A matches, the last of which came against Essex in the 1969 Gillette Cup.  In his 3 List-A matches, he scored 46 runs at a batting average of 15.33, with a high score of 34.  In the field he took a single catch.  With the ball he took a single wicket at a bowling average of 83.00, with best figures of 1/46.

Smith also played a single first-class match for the combined Minor Counties team in 1965 against the touring South Africans.  During the match he scored 20 runs, with a high score of 12, therefore leaving him with a batting average of 10.00.

References

External links
Anthony Smith at Cricinfo
Anthony Smith at CricketArchive

1930 births
Living people
People from Wiltshire
English cricketers
Wiltshire cricketers
Minor Counties cricketers